The 2001 Baltimore Orioles season involved the Orioles finishing 4th in the American League East with a record of 63 wins and 98 losses. It would also be the final season for Hall of Famer Cal Ripken Jr.

Offseason
October 5, 2000: Trenidad Hubbard was released by the Baltimore Orioles.
December 20, 2000: Mike Bordick was signed as a free agent with the Baltimore Orioles.

Regular season

In June 2001, Cal Ripken Jr. announced that he would retire at the end of the season. He was voted the starting third baseman in the All-Star game at Safeco Field on July 10, 2001 in Seattle. In a tribute to Ripken's achievements and stature in the game, shortstop Alex Rodriguez (unknowingly foreshadowing his own future) insisted on exchanging positions with third baseman Ripken for the first inning, so that Ripken could play shortstop as he had for most of his career. In the third inning, Ripken made his first plate appearance and was greeted with a standing ovation. Ripken then homered off the first pitch from Chan Ho Park. Ripken ended up with All-Star MVP honors.

Ripken's #8 was retired by the Baltimore Orioles in a ceremony before the final home game of the 2001 season. Ripken's final game was originally set to be played at Yankee Stadium; however, all Major League Baseball games from September 11 to 17 were postponed due to the terrorist attacks on New York City and the Pentagon. The Orioles were at home during the attacks, so the games missed were added on to the end of the season's schedule, which changed the location of Ripken's final game to Oriole Park, much to the delight of Orioles fans. Cal Ripken ended his career in the on deck circle in the bottom of the ninth inning. Longtime teammate Brady Anderson, also playing in his last game for the Orioles, swung and missed a fastball high and tight on a 3–2 count to end the game. In his final season, Ripken had the lowest zone rating of all major league third basemen (.734).

Opening Day starters
Brady Anderson
Mike Bordick
Delino DeShields
Brook Fordyce
Jerry Hairston Jr.
Pat Hentgen
Melvin Mora
Chris Richard
Cal Ripken Jr.
David Segui

Season standings

Record vs. opponents

Transactions
June 25, 2001: Tony Batista was selected off waivers by the Baltimore Orioles from the Toronto Blue Jays.

Roster

Player stats

Batting

Starters by position
Note: Pos = Position; G = Games played; AB = At bats; H = Hits; Avg. = Batting average; HR = Home runs; RBI = Runs batted in

Other batters
Note: G = Games played; AB = At bats; H = Hits; Avg. = Batting average; HR = Home runs; RBI = Runs batted in

Pitching

Starting pitchers
Note: G = Games pitched; IP = Innings pitched; W = Wins; L = Losses; ERA = Earned run average; SO = Strikeouts

Other pitchers 
Note: G = Games pitched; IP = Innings pitched; W = Wins; L = Losses; ERA = Earned run average; SO = Strikeouts

Relief pitchers 
Note: G = Games pitched; W = Wins; L = Losses; SV = Saves; ERA = Earned run average; SO = Strikeouts

Farm system
LEAGUE CHAMPIONS: Bluefield

References

2001 Baltimore Orioles team page at Baseball Reference
2001 Baltimore Orioles season at baseball-almanac.com

Baltimore Orioles seasons
Baltimore Orioles Season, 2001
Baltimore